Robert II of Burgundy (1248 – 21 March 1306) was Duke of Burgundy between 1272 and 1306 as well as titular King of Thessalonica. Robert was the third son of duke Hugh IV and Yolande of Dreux.

He married Agnes, youngest daughter of Louis IX of France, in 1279 and had the following issue:

Hugh V, Duke of Burgundy (1282–1315)
Blanche (1288–1348), married Edward, Count of Savoy
Margaret (1290–1315), married king Louis X of France
Joan (1293–1348), married count of Maine and Valois, king Philip VI of France
Odo IV, Duke of Burgundy (1295–1350)
Louis, Prince of Achaea (1297–1316), married Matilda of Hainaut
Mary (1298–1336) married Edward I, Count of Bar
Robert, Count of Tonnerre (1302–1334), married Joanna, heiress of Tonnerre

In 1284, Robert was invested with the duchy of Dauphiné by Rudolf of Habsburg. This was followed by two years of warfare which was ended when King Philip IV of France paid Robert 20,000 livres tournois to renounce his claim to the Dauphiné.

Robert ended the practice of giving away parts of the Burgundian estate to younger sons and as dowries to the daughters. From then on, the whole duchy, however already diminished by earlier dowries, passed unfragmented to the eldest son.

Ancestry

Notes

Sources

See also
Dukes of Burgundy family tree

1248 births
1306 deaths
House of Burgundy
Titular Kings of Thessalonica
Dukes of Burgundy
13th-century peers of France
14th-century peers of France